Friendship is co-operative and supportive behavior between two or more humans.

Friendship may also refer to:

Places

United States
 Friendship, Arkansas, a town
 Friendship, Indiana, an unincorporated community
Friendship, Kentucky, an unincorporated community
 Friendship, Maine, a town
 Friendship, Anne Arundel County, Maryland, an unincorporated community and census-designated place
 Friendship, Worcester County, Maryland, an unincorporated community
 Friendship, New Jersey, an unincorporated community
 Friendship, New York, a town
 Friendship (CDP), New York, a hamlet in the town
 Friendship, Cherokee County, North Carolina
 Friendship, Wake County, North Carolina
 Friendship, Ohio, a census-designated place
 Friendship, Oklahoma, a town
 Friendship, South Carolina, an unincorporated community
 Friendship, Tennessee, a city
 Friendship, Texas, a town
 Friendship, Virginia, an unincorporated community
 Friendship (town), Wisconsin, Fond du Lac County
 Friendship (village), Wisconsin, Adams County
 Friendship (Pittsburgh), a neighborhood of Pittsburgh, Pennsylvania
 Friendship (Stevensville, Maryland), a 1740 historic home on the National Register of Historic Places
 Friendship Township, Greene County, Arkansas, Greene County, Arkansas
 Friendship Township, Michigan
 Friendship Township, Minnesota
 Friendship Creek, New Jersey
 Friendship State Trail, Wisconsin

Elsewhere
 Friendship, Suriname, a town
 Mount Friendship, Himachal Pradesh, India
 Khüiten Peak or Friendship Peak, China
 Friendship Pass, a mountain pass in China

Ships 
 , five Royal Navy ships 
 Friendship (ship), various sailing ships

Aircraft 
 Fokker F27 Friendship, a turboprop airliner
 "Friendship", a Fokker Trimotor aircraft in which Amelia Earhart became the first woman passenger to cross the Atlantic Ocean by air

Arts and entertainment

Music 
 Friendship (band), an American indie rock band

Albums 
 Friendship (Lee Ritenour album), 1978
 Friendship (Perico Sambeat album), 2003
 Friendship (Ray Charles album), 1984
 Friendship (The Redneck Manifesto album), 2010
 Friendship, by Ash Ra Tempel, 2014

Songs 
 "Friendship", by Pops Staples from Don't Lose This, 2015
 "Friendship", by Sloan from Between the Bridges, 1999
 "Friendship", by Tenacious D from Tenacious D, 2001
 "Friendship", written by Cole Porter for the musical Du Barry Was a Lady, 1939; later interpolated into revivals of the musical Anything Goes
 "Friendship", a 2018 track by Toby Fox from Deltarune Chapter 1 OST from the video game Deltarune

Films 
 Friendship (2008 film), a Thai film
 Friendship (2021 film), an Indian Tamil-language film
 Friendship!, a 2010 German film

Other 
 The Friendship, a 1987 children's book by Mildred Taylor
 Friendship (Mortal Kombat), a finishing move in the video game series Mortal Kombat

Other uses 
 Friendship (NGO), an organization established in Bangladesh in 1998
 Friendship College, Rock Hill, South Carolina, United States, a college from 1891 to 1981
 Friendship Christian School (disambiguation)

See also
 Order of Friendship (disambiguation), various decorations
 "Friend Ship" (Steven Universe), an episode of Steven Universe
 West Friendship, Maryland
 Frenship, an American pop duo
 Friends (disambiguation)